Discography of Elmo Tanner, an American whistler, singer, bandleader and disc jockey, best known for his whistling on the chart-topping song “Heartaches” with the Ted Weems Orchestra.

as solo

singles

“Dawn of Tomorrow” – Paramount 12561 (recorded August 1927)
“Calling Me Home” (Gilbert - Monaco) – Paramount 12564 (recorded August 1927)
“I'm Waiting For Ships That Never Come In” (Abe Olman – Jack Yellen) – Paramount 12569 (recorded August 1927)
“Dear Old Girl” (Morse - Buck) – Paramount 12569 (recorded August 1927)
“Song of Hawaii” (Bories - Corbel) – Paramount 12532 (recorded September 1927)
“After I Called You Sweetheart” (Little - Grossman) – Paramount 12532 (recorded September 1927)
“Sing Me a Baby Song” (Donaldson - Kahn) – Paramount 12533 (recorded September 1927)
“So Blue” – Paramount 12533 (recorded September 1927)
“C'est Vous” – Vocalion 15637 (recorded September 1927)
“My Blue Heaven” (Donaldson - George Whiting) – Paramount 12563 (recorded October 1927)
“Just Once Again” (Donaldson - Ash) – Paramount 12563 (recorded October 1927)
“Marvelous” (Peter Derose – May Breen Singh) – Paramount 12570 (recorded October 1927)
“Sweetheart of Sigma Chi” (Stokes - Vernon) – Paramount 12570 (recorded October 1927)
“Girl of My Dreams” – Vocalion 15637 (recorded November 1927)
“You Only Want Me When You're Lonesome” – Vocalion 15639 (recorded November 1927)
“Tomorrow” – Vocalion 15639 (recorded November 1927)
“Give Me a Night in June” (Cliff Friend) – Paramount 12564 (recorded November 1927)
“Rain” – Vocalion 15649 (recorded January 17, 1928 Chicago)
“Away Down South in Heaven” – Vocalion 15650
“Does It Make Any Difference to You” – Vocalion 15650
“Rainy Day Pal” – Vocalion 15651 (recorded January 17, 1928 Chicago)
“So Tired” – Vocalion 15649 (recorded January 18, 1928 Chicago)
“Four Walls” – Vocalion 15651 (recorded January 18, 1928 Chicago)
“That’s How I Know I Love You” – Vocalion 15693 (recorded March 26, 1928 Chicago)
“If I Can’t Have You” – Vocalion 15694
“I Still Love You” – Vocalion 15694 (recorded June 29, 1928 Chicago)
“Back In Your Own Back Yard” – Vocalion 15687 (recorded June 29, 1928 Chicago)
“Remember Me” – Vocalion 15687 (recorded June 29, 1928 Chicago)
“ Just Across the Street from Heaven” – Vocalion 15693 (recorded June 29, 1928 Chicago)
“Don’t Wait Until the Lights are Low” – Vocalion 15711 (recorded July 20, 1928 Chicago)
“Grieving” – Vocalion 15726 (recorded July 20, 1928 Chicago)

“I’ve Lived All My Life Just for You” – Vocalion 15711 (recorded July 20, 1928 Chicago)
“That Old Sweetheart of Mine” – Vocalion 15726 (recorded July 20, 1928 Chicago)
“Jeannine, I Dream of Lilac Time” – Vocalion 15731 (recorded October 15, 1928 Chicago)
“Sonny Boy” – Vocalion 15731 (recorded October 15, 1928 Chicago)
“Because I Know You're Mine” – Vocalion 15744 (recorded November, 1928)
“Once in a Lifetime” – Vocalion 15744 (recorded November, 1928)
“Marie” (Irving Berlin) – Paramount 12720 (recorded November 1928)
“My Old Girl's My New Girl Now” (Caesar - Friend) – Paramount 12720 (recorded November 1928)
“Please Let Me Dream In Your Arms” – Paramount 12732 (recorded January 1929)
“My Mother’s Eyes” – Paramount 12732 (recorded January 1929)
“True Blue” – Paramount 12733 (recorded January 1929)
“Who Do You Miss” – Paramount 12733 (recorded January 1929)
“Out Where Moonbeams Are Born” – Vocalion 15814 (recorded July, 1929)
“Now I’m in Love” – Vocalion 15814 (recorded July, 1929)
“At Close of Day” – Vocalion 15825 (recorded July, 1929)
“Ich Liebe Dich” – Vocalion 15825 (recorded July, 1929)
“I Don't Want Your Kisses” – Vocalion 15829 (recorded July, 1929)
“Sweetheart's Holiday” – Vocalion 15829 (recorded July, 1929)
“Nobody’s Sweetheart” – MGM 10776
“Every Time You Turn Me Down – MGM 10776
“Whistling Paper Boy” – MGM 10886
“Candy Lips” – MGM 10886
“Tuscaloosa” (Schwartz - Fields) - MGM 10958A
“My Angel” (Baron – Kanter - Malkin.) - MGM 10958B
“Whispering” - Dot 15086 
“The Whistler and His Dog” - Dot 15086 
“Heartaches” – Dot 15112 (1953) 
“Nola” – Dot 15112 (1953) 
“Begin The Beguine” – Dot 15319 (1955) 
“Remembering” – Dot 15319 (1955) 
“Nightingale” – Dot 15411 (1955) 
“Avalon” – Dot 15411 (1955)

with David Carroll

albums
Let's Dance (1958) – Mercury SR 60001/MG 20281

with Wayne King

singles
“If I'm Dreaming” – Victor 22240

with Buddy Morrow

singles
“Theme From "The Proud Ones"” – Wing 90079

with Jimmie Noone’s Apex Club Orch

singles
“Virginia Lee” – Vocalion 1518 (recorded July 1, 1930 Chicago)
“Little White Lies” – Vocalion 1531 (recorded August 23, 1930 Chicago)
“Moonlight on the Colorado” – Vocalion 1531 (recorded August 23, 1930 Chicago)

with Jay Richards

singles
“Sweetness” – Vocalion 15835 (recorded August 29, 1929 Chicago)

with Frank Sullivan

singles
“An Old Guitar and an Old Refrain” – Vocalion 15648B

with Ted Weems

albums
Dance Set (1952) – Mercury MG-25144
Golden Favorites - Decca DL-4435

singles

“Heartaches” – Bluebird B5131 (recorded August 4, 1933)
“Lazy Weather” – Decca 822A (recorded May 15, 1936 Chicago)
“Buffoon” (Zez Confrey) – Decca 1884B (recorded Feb. 23, 1938 New York City)
“In My Little Red Book” – Decca 1695B (recorded Feb. 23, 1938 New York City)
“Nola” (Felix Arndt) – Decca 2041 (recorded Feb. 23, 1938 New York City)
“The Cute Little Hat-Check Girl” (Al Stillman – Ray Bloch - Nat Simon) – Decca 2019B (recorded Aug. 23, 1938 Los Angeles)
“Heartaches” – Decca 2020, 25017 (recorded Aug. 23, 1938 Los Angeles)
“Poor Pinocchio's Nose” – Decca 2408A (recorded Mar. 10, 1939 New York City)
“The Young 'Uns Of The Martins And The Coys” – Decca 25286B (recorded Mar. 10, 1939 New York City)
“The Chestnut Tree” – Decca 2380A (recorded Mar. 11, 1939 New York City)
“I Love To Ride On A Choo-Choo Train” – Decca 2366B (recorded Mar. 11, 1939 New York City)

“Moonlight” (Con Conrad) – Decca 3044A, 25105 (recorded Oct. 5, 1939 New York City) 
“Out Of The Night” (Harry Sosnik – Walter Hirsch) – Decca 3697A (recorded Jan. 27, 1941 New York City)
“Rose Of The Rockies” – Decca 3828B (recorded Jan. 28, 1941 New York City)
“Salud, Dinero y Amor” – Decca 3828A (recorded Jan. 28, 1941 New York City)
“Having A Lonely Time” – Decca 4131 (recorded Dec. 9, 1941 Los Angeles)
“Violets” (Green – Hill - Vallee) – Mercury 5052B
“Mickey” (Moret – Williams) – Mercury 5062A (recorded May 1947)
“The Martins and the Coys” (Cameron – Weems) – Mercury 5062A (recorded May 1947)
“Sally Won’t You Come Back” – Mercury 5118 and it was Elmo’s whistling that audiences most responded to.
“Ciribiribin” – Mercury 5118

References

Discographies of American artists
Pop music discographies
Jazz discographies